Glutamate dehydrogenase 2, mitochondrial, also known as GDH 2, is an enzyme that in humans is encoded by the GLUD2 gene. This dehydrogenase is one of the family of glutamate dehydrogenases that are ubiquitous in life.

Function 

Glutamate dehydrogenase 2 is localized to the mitochondrion and acts as a homohexamer to recycle glutamate during neurotransmission. The encoded enzyme catalyzes the reversible oxidative deamination of glutamate to alpha-ketoglutarate.

References

Further reading

EC 1.4.1